The 2017–18 season was Bologna Football Club 1909's third season back in Serie A, after the club's relegation at the end of the 2013–14 season. The club competed in Serie A, finishing 15th, and in the Coppa Italia, where they were eliminated in the third round by Serie B side Cittadella.

Players

Squad information

Transfers

In

Loans in

Out

Loans out

Pre-season and friendlies

Competitions

Serie A

League table

Results summary

Results by round

Matches

Coppa Italia

Statistics

Appearances and goals

|-
! colspan=14 style=background:#dcdcdc; text-align:center| Goalkeepers

|-
! colspan=14 style=background:#dcdcdc; text-align:center| Defenders

|-
! colspan=14 style=background:#dcdcdc; text-align:center| Midfielders

|-
! colspan=14 style=background:#dcdcdc; text-align:center| Forwards

|-
! colspan=14 style=background:#dcdcdc; text-align:center| Players transferred out during the season

Goalscorers

Last updated: 20 May 2018

Clean sheets

Last updated: 20 May 2018

Disciplinary record

Last updated: 20 May 2018

References

Bologna F.C. 1909 seasons
Bologna